Domnall mac Murchada or Domhnall mac Murchada may refer to:

Domhnall Caomhánach, (died 1175), king of Leinster
Domnall mac Murchada, (died 1075), king of Leinster and Dublin
Domnall Midi, (died 763), high king of Ireland